Kristina Zakrisson (born 2 March 1956) is a Swedish social democratic politician. She was a member of the Riksdag from 1994 to 2010 and has been Mayor of Kiruna Municipality since 2011.

External links
Kristina Zakrisson at the Riksdag website

Members of the Riksdag from the Social Democrats
Living people
1956 births
Women members of the Riksdag
Members of the Riksdag 1994–1998
21st-century Swedish women politicians
Members of the Riksdag 1998–2002
Members of the Riksdag 2002–2006
Members of the Riksdag 2006–2010
20th-century Swedish women politicians